Sukhbinder Singh Sarkaria is an Indian politician and from the Indian National Congress. He is a member of Punjab Legislative Assembly and represents Raja Sansi. He is a Punjab state cabinet minister holding the charges of the ministries of Revenue, Rehabilitation & Disaster Management and  Water Resources.

Early life
Sarkaria was born on 31 March 1956 in Amritsar to parents Narinder Singh Sarkaria and Amarjit Kaur.

Political career
Sarkaria first contested for Punjab Legislative Assembly on Congress ticket from Raja Sansi in 1997 but was unsuccessful. He again contested from Raja Sansi in 2002 as an independent candidate, but narrowly lost the election. He also contested the 2004 Lok Sabha election from Tarn Taran constituency. However, he was successful during 2007 Vidhan Sabha elections, when he won from Raja Sansi with a big margin. He was re-elected MLA for Raja Sansi in 2012.
He is elected MLA consecutively for the 3rd time in 2017 from Rajasansi constituency in the Punjab Legislative Assembly where he defeated Vir Singh Lopoke of the Shiromani Akali Dal.
He was the Chairman of Punjab Mandi Board during Capt. Amrinder Singh's government.

He is also the Vice President of Punjab Pradesh Congress Committee.

Sarkaria was one of the 42 INC MLAs who submitted their resignation in protest of a decision of the Supreme Court of India ruling Punjab's termination of the Sutlej-Yamuna Link (SYL) water canal unconstitutional.

MLA
The Aam Aadmi Party gained a strong 79% majority in the sixteenth Punjab Legislative Assembly by winning 92 out of 117 seats in the 2022 Punjab Legislative Assembly election. MP Bhagwant Mann was sworn in as Chief Minister on 16 March 2022.

References

 

 

Living people
Shiromani Akali Dal politicians
Indian Sikhs
Punjab, India MLAs 2007–2012
Punjab, India MLAs 2012–2017
Year of birth missing (living people)
People from Amritsar district
Place of birth missing (living people)
Indian National Congress politicians
Punjab, India MLAs 2017–2022
Punjab, India MLAs 2022–2027